Lauren Hogg (born June 10, 2003) is an American author and activist against gun violence. She survived the Stoneman Douglas High School shooting in 2018 and after became a co-founder of March for Our Lives and advocates against gun violence. She is the younger sister of gun control activist and former Marjory Stoneman Douglas student David Hogg. She graduated from MSD High School in 2021, three years after David.

Early life and Stoneman Douglas High School shooting

Hogg was born on June 10, 2003, and is the daughter of Kevin Hogg, a former agent of the Federal Bureau of Investigation, and Rebecca Boldrick, born in San Diego County, California and a teacher for Broward County Public Schools in Broward County, Florida. Hogg and her family moved to Washington, D.C. after her graduation in 2021.

On February 14, 2018, Hogg was a freshman at Marjory Stoneman Douglas High School when a 19-year-old former student of the school entered the campus and started shooting with a semi-automatic rifle. Hogg was in a television production class when the shooting started; the fire alarm was activated and she believed it was possibly a prank because they had had a fire alarm drill earlier in the day. When Hogg and other students were in the stairwell after evacuating due to the alarm, she realized that it was not a prank after she saw students running out of the building. She went back to her classroom and unlocked a closet in the room and hid with other students. Hogg reunited with her brother and father later that day. Her friends Jaime Guttenburg,   Alaina Petty,   Alyssa Alhadeff, and Gina Montalto were killed in the shooting.

Gun control advocacy 
After the shooting, Hogg became an activist against gun rights in the United States and became a co-founder of the March for Our Lives protests. She co-authored a book with her brother, David Hogg, called #NeverAgain: A New Generation Draws the Line published by Random House.

Hogg testified as a witness before the United States House Homeland Security Subcommittee on Emergency Preparedness, Response and Recovery in September 2019, following new legislation in the United States Senate that addressed school safety. Before the hearing, she spoke at a rally against gun rights alongside House Speaker Nancy Pelosi and Senate Minority Leader Chuck Schumer. Speaking to members of the subcommittee, Hogg said, "I think if we did enough, I wouldn't be here. I wouldn't have lost my friends." She also told members that lawmakers need to take steps including hiring mental health professionals to provide grief counseling to students and provide security in schools, in opposition to Governor of Florida Ron DeSantis signing a bill into law allowing public school districts to arm teachers.

In 2019 Hogg wrote Activist, a graphic novel.

Political views 
Hogg describes herself as liberal and supports raising the purchase age of firearms from 18 to 21, because the shooter of the Stoneman Douglas High School shooting was 19 years old and purchased the gun legally.

Bibliography

References

External links 
 
 

2003 births
Living people
21st-century American writers
American gun control activists
American shooting survivors
American child activists
American political writers
Place of birth missing (living people)
Crime witnesses
Gun politics in the United States
People from Parkland, Florida
Stoneman Douglas High School shooting activists
Writers from Florida